Shawn Ryan (born October 11, 1966 in Rockford, Illinois) is an American screenwriter and television producer.

He created and co-created a number of TV drama series, including The Shield (2002–2008), The Chicago Code (2011), Last Resort (2012–13), Timeless (2016–2018) and S.W.A.T. (2017–present). He also produced The Unit (2006–2009), Lie to Me (2009–11), Terriers (2010), and Mad Dogs (2015–16).

Early life 
Shawn Ryan grew up in Rockford, Illinois. His mother is a schoolteacher and his father is a CPA. He said he had "a very good family upbringing" and was interested in 1970s sitcoms as a child.

Career 
After graduating from Middlebury College, Ryan got his start in television when he entered and won the Norman Lear Playwriting award sponsored by Columbia Pictures Television (which later became Sony).  The award included a $25,000 cash gift and meetings with Columbia's top television producers.  Later he was a staff writer on the show Nash Bridges and served as a writer/producer on Angel before creating and acting as Head Writer on The Shield. He was partnered with David Mamet to serve as showrunner for The Unit. 

Ryan was set to executive produce Confessions of a Contractor, a 2009 CBS television pilot based on Richard Murphy's book of the same name. The story centres on a successful L.A. contractor who becomes involved with two of his female clients.  The production was put on hold when casting contingencies could not be met. He was the show runner for season 2 of Fox's Lie to Me. He was the show runner and executive producer of FX's Terriers. He created the crime drama The Chicago Code. In 2012, Ryan's pilot Last Resort got picked up by ABC for the fall. On November 21, 2012, it was announced that producers had been given enough notice of the network's plans not to pick the show up for a full season and that they were reworking the final episode to function as a series finale and give the fans closure.

In January 2013, CBS picked up Beverly Hills Cop, an hourlong crime procedural with comedic elements, with Ryan on board to pen the script and executive produce along with his MiddKid Productions partner Marney Hochman and Eddie Murphy. The potential series was a follow-up to the Murphy franchise and centered on Foley's son, Aaron (played by Brandon T. Jackson), a cop working in Beverly Hills as he tries to escape his famous father's shadow.  Barry Sonnenfeld directed the pilot. In May 2013, CBS announced it would not pick up the show.

Awards and nominations
He was nominated for Outstanding Writing for a Drama Series in 2002 (Emmy Award), and a Humanitas Prize in 1998.

Personal life
Ryan is married to actress Cathy Cahlin Ryan, who starred on The Shield and The Chicago Code. They have two children.

References

External links and further reading
 
 
 
 

1966 births
American television writers
Living people
Middlebury College alumni
American male television writers
Screenwriters from Illinois
Television producers from Illinois
The Shield
Writers from Rockford, Illinois